Welcome to the House (Traditional Chinese: 高朋滿座) is a TVB modern sitcom series broadcast from April 2006 to March 2007.

The series surrounded the day-to-day lives of the Ko family.

Cast

External links
TVB.com Welcome to the House - Official Website 

TVB dramas
2006 Hong Kong television series debuts
2007 Hong Kong television series endings